Everything for Sale may refer to:

 Everything for Sale (1921 film), American silent film
 Everything for Sale (1969 film), Polish film